Colorado's 1st congressional district is a congressional district in the U.S. state of Colorado based primarily in the City and County of Denver in the central part of the state. The district includes all of the City and County of Denver, and the Denver enclaves of Glendale and Holly Hills.

The district has been represented by Democrat Diana DeGette since 1997. An urban and diverse district based in the heart of Metropolitan Denver, with a Cook Partisan Voting Index rating of D+29, it is the most Democratic district in the American West not located on the Pacific coast.  Only two Republicans have been elected to the seat since the Great Depression: Dean M. Gillespie was the district's representative from 1944 to 1947, and Mike McKevitt from 1971 to 1973, winning thanks to an ideological split among Denver Democrats. No Republican has even notched 30% of the vote in the district after 1998.

History

1990s
Following the 1990 United States census and consequential redrawing of Colorado's congressional districts, the 1st congressional district consisted of all of the City and County of Denver and parts of Adams, Arapahoe, and Jefferson counties.

2000s
Following the 2000 United States census and consequential redistricting of Colorado's congressional districts, the 1st congressional district consisted of all of the City and County of Denver and parts of Arapahoe County, including parts or all of the cities of Englewood, Cherry Hills Village, Sheridan, Aurora, and Glendale.

2010s

Following the 2010 United States census and consequential redistricting of Colorado's congressional districts, the 1st congressional district consisted of all of the City and County of Denver and parts of Arapahoe County including parts or all of the cities of Englewood, Cherry Hills Village, Sheridan, Aurora, and Glendale. The 1st district also took in additional area in the southwestern suburbs which included parts of Jefferson County and the CDPs of Columbine and Ken Caryl.

2020s

Following the 2020 United States census and consequential redistricting of Colorado's congressional districts, the 1st congressional district consisted of all of the City and County of Denver and parts of Arapahoe County that are enclaves within the Denver city borders such as Glendale and Holly Hills: the Jefferson County portions were moved to the 7th District, while the southern Arapahoe County suburbs were moved to the Aurora-based 6th District.

Voting

List of members representing the district

Election results

1892

1894

1896

1898

1900

1902

1904

1906

1908

1910

1912

1914

1916

1918

1920

1922

1924

1926

1927 (special)

1928

1930

1932

1934

1936

1938

1940

1942

1944 (special)

1944 (general)

1946

1948

1950

1952

1954

1956

1958

1960

1962

1964

1966

1968

1970

1972

1974

1976

1978

1980

1982

1984

1986

1988

1990

1992

1994

1996

1998

2000

2002

2004

2006

2008

2010

2012

2014

2016

2018

2020

2022

Historical district boundaries

See also

Colorado's congressional districts
List of United States congressional districts

References

 Congressional Biographical Directory of the United States 1774–present

1
Government of Denver
Adams County, Colorado
Arapahoe County, Colorado
Jefferson County, Colorado